is a Japanese manga series written by Ryohgo Narita and illustrated by Shinta Fujimoto. It began serialization in Square Enix's Young Gangan in October 2017. As of April 2022, the series' individual chapters have been collected into ten volumes. An anime television series adaptation by Geek Toys is set to premiere in April 2023.

Characters

Media

Manga
Written by Ryohgo Narita and illustrated by Shinta Fujimoto, the series began serialization in Square Enix's Young Gangan magazine on October 20, 2017. As of November 2022, the series' individual chapters have been collected into ten tankōbon volumes.

Yen Press is publishing the series in English and is releasing chapters simultaneously with their Japanese release.

Volume list

Anime
An anime television series adaptation was announced on November 15, 2022. It is produced by Geek Toys and directed by Manabu Ono, with assistant direction by Takaharu Ōkuma, sub-direction by Yoshiki Kitai, scripts written by Ono, Yukie Sugawara, and Yoriko Tomita, character designs handled by Hisashi Abe, and music composed by F.M.F, a group composed of Yūki Nara, Eba, and Kana Utatane. The series will air for two cours. The first cour is set to premiere on April 11, 2023, on Tokyo MX and other networks, while the second cour is set for October 2023. At Anime NYC 2022, Crunchyroll announced that they licensed the series.

Reception
Rebecca Silverman, Amy McNulty, and Teresa Navarro from Anime News Network offered praise for the artwork, plot,  and characters, though they were critical of the fan service. Richard Gutierrez from The Fandom Post offered praise for the premise and artwork, though he felt the plot was too complicated and confusing. 

In the 2020 Next Manga Award, the series ranked 20th in the print manga category.

See also
Red Raven – a manga series written and illustrated by Shinta Fujimoto.

References

External links
  
  
 

2023 anime television series debuts
Action anime and manga
Anime series based on manga
Crunchyroll anime
Dark fantasy anime and manga
Fiction about reincarnation
Gangan Comics manga
Geek Toys
Isekai anime and manga
Seinen manga
Yen Press titles